The 2004 Fordham Rams football team was an American football team that represented Fordham University during the 2004 NCAA Division I-AA football season. Fordham finished fifth in the Patriot League. 

In their first year under head coach Ed Foley, the Rams compiled a 5–6 record. Jared Amatuzzo, NaQuinton Gainous, Edward Gordon and Tad Kornegay were the team captains.

Despite their losing record, the Rams outscored opponents 288 to 270. Their 2–4 conference record placed fifth out of seven in the Patriot League standings. 

Fordham played its home games at Jack Coffey Field on the university's Rose Hill campus in The Bronx, in New York City.

Schedule

References

Fordham
Fordham Rams football seasons
Fordham Rams football